Viscount  was an admiral in the early Imperial Japanese Navy.

Biography
Nakamuta was born in Saga domain (present day Saga prefecture). He was a samurai-sailor in the domainal navy, which later became the core of the fledgling Imperial Japanese Navy. During the Boshin War to overthrow the Tokugawa bakufu, Nakamuta was captain of the frigate Chōyō at the Naval Battle of Hakodate. The Chōyō exploded after being hit by the rebel ship Banryū, but Nakamuta survived.

After the establishment of the Meiji government and the official creation of the Imperial Japanese Navy, Nakamuta was given the rank of commander (14 December 1870) and became deputy commandant of the Imperial Japanese Naval Academy. He was promoted to captain in 1871 and rear admiral the same year. He also became commandant of the Naval Academy in 1871. He was promoted to vice admiral in 1878.

Subsequently, Nakamuta was commander in chief of the Tokai Naval District (1880–1886), Yokosuka Naval District (1886–1889) and Kure Naval District (1889–1892). He was appointed Chief of the Imperial Japanese Navy General Staff in 1892, and was concurrently commandant of the Naval Staff College.

On 7 July 1884, Natamura was ennobled with the title of viscount (shishaku) under the kazoku peerage system. He was appointed a member of the Privy Council (Japan) in 1894, where he was outspoken in his opposition against the First Sino-Japanese War.

Nakamuta was forced out of active duty and into the reserves in 1900 by his political rivals Yamamoto Gonnohyōe and Kabayama Sukenori, and officially retired in 1905. He died in 1916. His grave is at Aoyama Cemetery in Tokyo.

References

Books

External links

Biography site with grave (Japanese)

Notes

1837 births
1916 deaths
Kazoku
People of Meiji-period Japan
Imperial Japanese Navy admirals
People from Saga Prefecture
People of the Boshin War
Nabeshima retainers